Lophius brachysomus is an extinct species of anglerfish in the family Lophiidae. It was described by Louis Agassiz in 1835 from the Monte Bolca locality. It became extinct during the middle Eocene (lowermost 
Lutetian).

Species known from three or four individuals. Habitat of this species described as place in a tropical or subtropical, moderately deep basin like a coastal lagoon in inner continental shelf regions of the central Tethys Sea, with reduced hydrodynamic energy and episodic anoxic conditions, with soft mud or sand bottoms, much like extant members of the family.

Together with Sharfia mirabilis this species is one of the oldest member of the family Lophiidae known to date.

It was stated to have large triangular opercles, a facial support structure and protective covering for the gills of many bony fish, with concave anterior and anteroventral margins and a peculiar cancellous texture on its medial surface, as seen through its fossilized remains.

Type specimen deposited in the National Museum of Natural History (France).

References

Prehistoric fish
Fossil taxa described in 1835
Eocene life
Taxa named by Louis Agassiz
brachysomus